Dhrol State was one of the 562 princely states of British India. It was a 9 gun salute state belonging to the Kathiawar Agency of the Bombay Presidency.
Its capital was in the town of Dhrol, located in the historical Halar region of Kathiawar.

History
Dhrol State was founded in 1595 by Jam Hardholji, a brother of Jam Rawal, the founder of Nawanagar State. The royal family belonged to the senior-most branch of the Jadeja dynasty of Rajputs who are the descendants of Samma tribe of Sindh . The Khirasra state was an offshoot of Dhrol.

Dhrol State became a British protectorate in 1807. The population of the state was decimated by the Indian famine of 1899–1900, from 27,007 in 1891 it was reduced to 21,906 in the 1901 census. The last ruler of Dhrol State, Thakur Sahib Chandrasinhji Dipsinhji, signed the accession to the Indian Union on 15 February 1948.

Rulers
The rulers of the state bore the title 'Thakore Saheb'. They had the right to a 9 gun salute.

Rulers 
1595 – .... Hardholji
.... – .... Jasoji Hardolji
.... – .... Bamanyanji Jasoji
.... – .... Hardholji Bamanyanji I
.... – 1644 Modji Hardholji
1644 – 1706 Kaloji I Panchanji
1706 – 1712 Junhoji I Kaloji
1712 – 1715 Ketoji Junoji
1715 – 1716 Kaloji II Junoji                   (d. 1716)
1716 – 1760 Vaghji Junoji
1760 – 1781 Jaysinhji I Vaghji
1781 – 1789 Junoji II Jaysinhji
1789 – .... Nathoji Junoji
.... – 1803 Modji Nathoji
1803 – 1844 Bhuptasinhji Modji
1845 – 1886 Jaysinhji II Bhuptasinhji          (b. 1824 – d. 1886)
26 Oct 1886 – 31 July 1914 Harisinhji Jaisinhji               (b. 1846 – d. 1914)
 2 September 1914 – 31 August 1937 Dolatsinhji Harisinhji            (b. 1864 – d. 1937)
31 Aug 1937 – 1939 Jorawarsinhji Dipsinhji            (b. 1910 – d. 1939)
10 Oct 1939 – 15 August 1947 Chandrasinhji Dipsinhji            (b. 1912 – d. ....)

See also
Political integration of India
Baroda, Western India and Gujarat States Agency

References

Kathiawar Agency
Princely states of India
Jamnagar district
Rajputs
Jadejas
1948 disestablishments in India
1595 establishments in India
States and territories established in 1595